Hamars Ness  is a headland on the island of Fetlar in Shetland, Scotland. The name is from the Old Norse Hamarsnes meaning "craggy headland". A ro-ro ferry is operated from here, which links Fetlar to the Shetland Mainland, and to the island of Unst. Hamars Ness is to the north of Fetlar's main village of Houbie.

Landforms of Shetland
Headlands of Scotland
Fetlar